Europe of Freedom and Democracy (EFD) was a Eurosceptic political group in the European Parliament. The group was formed following the 2009 European parliamentary election, mostly composed of elements of the Independence/Democracy (IND/DEM) and Union for a Europe of Nations (UEN) groups that had existed during the 6th European Parliament. The group had a loose relationship with Movement for a Europe of Liberties and Democracy (MELD), a European political party founded in 2011.

The EFD was a coalition of ten political parties – the largest being the UK Independence Party (UKIP) with eleven seats and the Italian Lega Nord, with nine seats – along with one independent. The EFD is hostile to further European integration, and more nationalistic and anti-immigration than its main predecessor IND/DEM. The EFD was considered to belong on the right-wing to far-right of the political spectrum.

On 24 June 2014 EFD group became Europe of Freedom and Direct Democracy (EFDD) for the 8th European Parliament, with the continuing membership of just two of the eleven political parties that formed EFD.

History

Formation
Following the 2009 European parliament elections, the Independence/Democracy (IND/DEM) and Union for a Europe of Nations (UEN), two political groups of the European Parliament, were in trouble. The UK Independence Party (UKIP) component of IND/DEM had done well, but the other parties of this group fared very poorly. UEN had also lost MEPs and both groups had fallen under the threshold required for a group to exist. The remnants of both groups needed to find a new group before the constitutive session of the 7th European Parliament on 14 July 2009.

Speculation regarding the new group surfaced on 30 June 2009. The name of the group was originally speculated as A Europe of Free Peoples, or A Europe of Peoples for Liberty, or a phrase involving the word Independence or Freedom or Democracy or People. In the absence of an official name, the nascent group was given the placeholder name of Liberty. On 1 July 2009 a press conference was held launching the group. That press conference named the group Europe of Freedom and Democracy.

Andreas Mölzer, the leader of the Freedom Party of Austria (FPÖ) European Parliament list, announced in July 2009 that FPÖ and EFD were in negotiations over FPÖ joining the group; each side had reservations about the other, with UKIP, the Reformed Political Party (SGP) of the Netherlands, and the Slovak National Party (SNS) each uneasy about the inclusion of the FPÖ. In June 2011, the FPÖ tried again to have its two MEPs join the faction, but was again denied, being opposed by five or six of the nine parties in the EFD.

Defections
In March 2010 it was announced that MEP Nikki Sinclaire had had the UKIP whip withdrawn. Sinclaire had refused to join the EFD on the grounds that it was a grouping with "extreme views" and consequently had not sat with her UKIP colleagues in the European parliament. In June 2010 MEP Mike Nattrass also left the EFD, albeit on other grounds than Sinclaire, stating that "I don't share the same principles of some of the Group, on balance, the majority of the Group want to stay in the EU and I've always believed that we should leave." Nattrass later rejoined the group in December 2012. In March 2011 MEP Trevor Colman left the EFD, allegedly due to an "unresolved dispute over financial and staffing issues." However Colman continued to represent UKIP as a Non-Attached MEP. On 24 May 2011, British MEP David Campbell Bannerman defected to the Conservative Party, and the European Conservatives and Reformists (ECR) group.

In March 2011, Danish MEP Anna Rosbach left the EFD, and in turn joined the ECR group as an independent.

The EFD was joined by Belgian MEP Frank Vanhecke in November 2011, after Vanhecke left Flemish Interest (VB). It was joined by Magdi Allam in December 2011, when Allam defected from the Union of Christian and Centre Democrats (UDC) in the EPP group. The four MEPs from United Poland defected from the ECR group on 26 December 2011, taking the group's numbers to 33. In March 2012 Roger Helmer who was elected as a British Conservative Party MEP and previously sat with the ECR group, defected to UKIP and the EFD, raising the group's numbers to 34.

In late 2012, Slavcho Binev MEP of People for Real, Open and United Democracy (PROUD) joined the group.

In February 2013 Marta Andreasen announced she was leaving UKIP and defected to the Conservative Party.

In late September 2013, National Front for the Salvation of Bulgaria (NSFB) joined the group.

Reformation for 8th European Parliament

Composition

Europe of Freedom and Democracy had 34 elected members between 2009 and 2014, they are as follows:

Leadership
Co-president: Nigel Farage (2009–2014)
Co-president: Francesco Speroni (2009–2014)

References

External links
 Official website of the EFD Group in the European Parliament

Former European Parliament party groups
Euroscepticism
Far-right politics in Europe